One Step Beyond may refer to:

Music 
 One Step Beyond (Dungeon album) or the title song, 2004
 One Step Beyond (Jackie McLean album), 1963
 One Step Beyond..., an album by Madness, or the title song (see below), 1979
 One Step Beyond, an album by the Chocolate Watchband, 1969
One Step Beyond, an album by Chris Ward, 1996
 "One Step Beyond" (song), by Prince Buster, 1964; covered by Madness, 1979
 One Step Beyond, a Canadian jazz band including Andrew Scott
 One Step Beyond, a 1992 rave at Donington Park organized by Fantazia
 One Step Beyond, a ska, bluebeat, and rocksteady radio show on WRAS in Atlanta, Georgia, U.S.

Television
 Alcoa Presents: One Step Beyond, an American anthology television series 1959–1961, hosted by John Newland
 One Step Beyond, a series on the Discovery Channel
 One Step Beyond, a TVB drama series featuring Deric Wan

Other uses 
 One Step Beyond, a game for the Amiga system
 One Step Beyond, a skateboarding documentary featuring Brian Sumner